Dimitrios Mavroeidis (alternate spellings: Dimitris, Mavroidis) (Greek: Δημήτρης Μαυροειδής; born July 4, 1985) is a Greek professional basketball player and the team captain for AEK Athens of the Greek Basket League and the Basketball Champions League. He is a 2.12 m (6 ft 11  in) tall center.

Professional career
Mavroeidis began his professional career with the Greek League club Peristeri in 2002. He moved to Panionios in 2005. He signed with Maroussi in 2007. In 2010, he joined the Spanish ACB League club Bilbao Basket.

In 2012, he joined the EuroLeague club Olympiacos. With Olympiacos, he won the 2012–13 championship of the EuroLeague.

He moved to Nea Kifissia in 2014. During the first round of the 2014–15 Greek Basket League, he was voted as the MVP of the week's first round of the Greek Basket League.

On November 9, 2015, Mavroeidis signed with AEK Athens, until the end of the season. On November 11, Mavroeidis made his debut with AEK against Neptūnas in the EuroCup, scoring 4 points, and grabbing 3 rebounds, in his team's 80–86 win. After the departure of Loukas Mavrokefalidis from AEK on August 27, 2016, the team renewed Mavroeidis' contract for one more season.

On August 9, 2017, AEK re-signed Mavroeidis for his third season with the club. With AEK, he won the 2018 Final of the Greek Cup and the FIBA 2017–18 Basketball Champions League.

Mavroeidis spent the 2018-19 campaign with Kolossos Rodou, before returning once more to AEK to finish out his career. He started out the 2021–22 season in an ancillary role, before stepping up after a series of injuries for the team, as well as the tragic passing of Stevan Jelovac. In 21 league games, he averaged 5.9 points and 4.4 rebounds, playing around 15 minutes per contest.

National team career
Mavroeidis won the silver medal at the 2009 Mediterranean Games, while playing with the under-26 national team of Greece. With the senior men's Greek national basketball team, he played at the EuroBasket 2011. He was also a member of Greece's national team that played at the 2012 FIBA World Olympic Qualifying Tournament

He also played at the 2019 FIBA European World Cup qualification.

Personal life
Mavroeidis has roots from Vrises Lasithi.

Career statistics

Domestic Leagues

Regular season

|-
| 2007–08
| style="text-align:left;"| Maroussi
| align=center | GBL
| 20  || 11.1 || .611 || .000 || .667 || 2.6 || .3 || .7 || .4 || 4.2
|-
| 2008–09
| style="text-align:left;"| Maroussi
| align=center | GBL
| 25  || 14.4 || .653 || .000 || .675 || 4.2 || .4 || .6 || .5 || 4.8
|-
| 2009–10
| style="text-align:left;"| Maroussi
| align=center | GBL
| 22  || 19.2 || .587 || .000 || .688 || 5.6 || .6 || .3 || .9 || 9.7
|-
| 2012–13
| style="text-align:left;"| Olympiacos
| align=center | GBL
| 15  || 11.4 || .636 || .000 || .697 || 3.5 || .5 || .4 || .5 || 5.3
|-
| 2014–15
| style="text-align:left;"| Kifissia
| align=center | GBL
| 26  || 27.1 || .556 || .000 || .625 || 7.5 || 1.5 || 1.2 || .8 || 14.0
|-
| 2015–16
| style="text-align:left;"| Kifissia
| align=center | GBL
| 5  || 31.4 || .473 || .000 || .778 || 10.2 || 1.4 || .8 || .4 || 14.6
|-
| 2015–16
| style="text-align:left;"| A.E.K.
| align=center | GBL
| 21  || 16.2 || .674 || .000 || .688 || 4.6 || .5 || .6 || .7 || 8.8
|-
| 2016–17
| style="text-align:left;"| A.E.K.
| align=center | GBL
| 22  || 17.3 || .635 || .000 || .658 || 3.6 || .9 || .6 || .5 || 7.8
|-
| 2017–18
| style="text-align:left;"| A.E.K.
| align=center | GBL
| 26  || 15.2 || .546 || .000 || .693 || 4.6 || .4 || .4 || .3 || 7.7
|-
| 2018–19
| style="text-align:left;"| Kolossos
| align=center | GBL
| 25  || 22.5 || .553 || .000 || .752 || 7.4 || 1.3 || .3 || .4 || 11.1
|}

FIBA Champions League

|-
| style="text-align:left;" | 2016–17
| style="text-align:left;" | A.E.K.
| 15 || 16.4 || .441 || - || .778 || 4.0 || 1.1 || .7 || .7 || 6.7
|-
| style="text-align:left;background:#AFE6BA;" | 2017–18†
| style="text-align:left;" | A.E.K.
| 20 || 16.4 || .653 || - || .641 || 4.2 || .7 || .2 || .2 || 8.3
|}

Awards and accomplishments

Pro career
 EuroLeague Champion: (2013)
 Greek Cup Winner (2): (2018, 2020)
 FIBA Champions League Champion: (2018)

Greek national team
2009 Mediterranean Games:

References

External links
 Euroleague.net Profile
 FIBA Profile
 Eurobasket.com Profile
 Greek Basket League Profile 
 Hellenic Federation Profile 
 Spanish League Profile 
 Draftexpress.com Profile
 Euroleague.net Interview

Living people
1985 births
AEK B.C. players
Bilbao Basket players
Centers (basketball)
Competitors at the 2009 Mediterranean Games
Greek Basket League players
Greek expatriate basketball people in Spain
Greek men's basketball players
Kolossos Rodou B.C. players
Liga ACB players
Maroussi B.C. players
Mediterranean Games medalists in basketball
Mediterranean Games silver medalists for Greece
Nea Kifissia B.C. players
Olympiacos B.C. players
Panionios B.C. players
Basketball players from Athens
Peristeri B.C. players